Karşıyaka is a historic railway station currently in use on İZBAN's Northern Line, in the famous Karşıyaka district of İzmir. The station is located at the northern end of the Karşıyaka Çarşı (Main Street). The station is located underground in the Karşıyaka Tunnel. It is the busiest İZBAN station in terms of passengers, serving 8,380 passengers daily. The station is also a transfer point for ESHOT buses as well as Minibus service to nearby towns.

Overview
The original station was opened on October 10, 1865, by the Smyrna Cassaba Railway. On June 1, 1934, the Turkish State Railways acquired the station when they bought the SCP. The station has become a landmark of the district and had TCDD #44062 locomotive plinthed next to the station. On July 23, 2006, the station was closed for construction of the new underground station. Karşıyaka station was moved underground and the former trackbed above was converted into a park. The station reopened on December 10, 2010, after remaining dormant for over 4 years.

References

Railway stations in İzmir Province
Railway stations opened in 1865
1865 establishments in the Ottoman Empire
Karşıyaka District